Caesium hexafluorocobaltate(IV) is a salt with the chemical formula . The salt contains rare example of cobalt(IV) complex, i.e. [CoF6]2-.

It has cubic K2PtCl6 structure, with the lattice constant a = 8.91 Å, and the length of Co-F bond is 1.73 Å. The complex is ferromagnetic and the ground state of Co(IV) is T2g3Eg2.

See also 
 Percobaltate

References 

Caesium compounds
Cobalt complexes
Fluoro complexes
Metal halides
Fluorometallates
Ferromagnetic materials
Cobalt compounds